There have been two baronetcies created for persons with the same surname - Wynn, these baronetcies descended from north Wales.

Firstly the Gwydir family was in the List of baronetcies in the Baronetage of England, and secondly, the Bodvean family evolved from the Baronetage of Great Britain.

The family name Wynn originates from North Wales. The first mention of the Wynn family of Gwydir was used by the children of Maredudd ap Ifan (died 1525), and subsequently adopted as a surname by Maerdudd's grandchildren, including Maurice Wynn (died 1580), ancestor of the Wynn's of Gwydir. Whereas the Wynns of Bodvean (subsequently Baron Newborough) descended from John Wyn ap Hugh (John Wynne, died 1576).

An example of intermarriages between both Wynn families was John Bodvel (1617–1663). Bodvel was a grandchild of Sir John Wynn, 1st Baronet of Gwydir, and also Hugh Gwyn's (died 1611) great-grandchild, Gwyn being one of John Wynne of Bodvean's (died 1576) children.

Wynn of Gwydir

The Wynn Baronetcy, of Gwydir in the County of Carnarvon, was created in the Baronetage of England on 29 June 1611 for John Wynn. The members of this line were heirs to the Aberffraw claim to the Kingdom of Gwynedd and subsequently the Principality of Wales as direct descendants of Prince Owain Gwynedd, the King of Gwynedd.

The history of the Wynn's of Gwydir begins with the father of Maurice Wynn, the eponymous John "Wynn" ap Maredudd. John had rebuilt Gwydir around 1555 after inheriting the lease of Gwydir from his father Maredudd ap Ifan, Maredudd had purchased the estate from Dafydd ap Hywel Coetmor around 1500, Maredudd also purchased the lease for Dolwyddelan Castle, built Penamnen and owned lands in Nantconwy and Llanfrothen. Maurice was the first to adopt the family name 'Wynn' and was a high sheriff and a member of parliament in Caernarvonshire during the 16th century. The family continued to be prominent in politics, and all the baronets except for Owen (3rd baronet) sat as Members of Parliament, often for Carnarvonshire or other parts of England and Wales. On the death of the fifth baronet, the title became extinct in 1719.

Wynn of Gwydir inheritances

Before the baronetcy of Wynn of Gwydir became extinct, there had been marriages and inheritances shared amongst the descendants of the family. Mary Wynn, an only child, and heiress of the fourth Baronet was the wife of Robert Bertie, 17th Baron Willoughby de Eresby and 1st Duke of Ancaster and Kesteven, of Grimsthorpe Castle, and is now represented by the Baron Carrington who sold Gwydir Castle in 1921. Another descendant of the 4th baronet, Richard Wynn, was Sir Peter Burrell, husband of Priscilla Bertie, 21st Baroness Willoughby de Eresby, of Drummond Castle, Peter was created Baron Gwydyr in 1796. Peter's wife Priscilla was a daughter of Peregrine Bertie, 3rd Duke of Ancaster and Kesteven, and Duchess Mary Panton, the Barons of Willoughby de Eresby family seat is Grimsthorpe Castle. 

The fifth baronet succeeded his cousin as baronet and inherited the Wynnstay estate, near Ruabon, north Wales. Wynnstay had been the family seat of the Wynn family. The mansion eventually passed to a cousin of the Wynn baronet, Jane Thelwell, and her husband Sir Watkin Williams-Wynn, 3rd Baronet who inherited the estate.  Williams added the surname Wynn to his name, today the Wynn baronets are represented by the Williams-Wynn baronets.

Wynn baronets, of Gwydir (1611)
Sir John Wynn, 1st Baronet (died 1627)
Sir Richard Wynn, 2nd Baronet (c. 1588–1649)
Sir Owen Wynn, 3rd Baronet (died 1660)
Sir Richard Wynn, 4th Baronet (c. 1625–1674), only child and daughter Mary married Robert Bertie, 1st Duke of Ancaster and Kesteven, now represented by Baron Carrington
Sir John Wynn, 5th Baronet (c. 1628–1719), upon extinction of the baronetcy, the family estate was inherited by a cousin and is still represented today by the Williams-Wynn baronets.

Wynn of Gwydir family tree

Maurice Wynn (Morys Wynn ap John), died on 18 August 1580.
 Sir John Wynn, 1st baronet.
Sir Richard Wynn, 2nd baronet.
Sir Owen Wynn, 3rd baronet.
Sir Richard Wynn, 4th baronet.
 Henry Wynn
Sir John Wynn, 5th baronet.

Wynn of Bodvean

The Wynn Baronetcy, of Bodvean in the County of Carnarvon, was created in the Baronetage of Great Britain on 25 October 1742 for Sir Thomas Wynn. The family origins were from near Boduan, north Wales.

John Wynn (John Wyn ap Hugh of Bodvel, died 1576) being the Bodvel family ancestor, John was high sheriff for Caernarfon. Wynn was the standard bearer for John, Earl of Warwick / Duke of  Northumberland, this was for the Earl of Warwick's service at Kett's Rebellion in 1549 and he received Bardsey Island (near Gwynedd) for his feats. Wynn descended directly from the Kings of Gwynedd via Collwyn ap Tangno (founder of the 5th tribe of the Fifteen Tribes of Wales). The Wynn of Bodvean family are also descendants of Ynyr Fychan from the Nannau family dynasty in Wales. The Wynn of Bodvel (Bodvean) family is now represented by Baron Newborough.

Wynn Baronets, of Bodvean (1742)
Sir Thomas Wynn, 1st Baronet (1677–1749)
Sir John Wynn, 2nd Baronet (1701–1773)
Sir Thomas Wynn, 3rd Baronet (1736–1807), (created Baron Newborough in 1776).

See also
Williams-Wynn baronets
Baron Newborough
Wynne baronets of Leeswood
Baron Gwydyr

References

Further reading

 

 

 

Baronetcies in the Baronetage of Great Britain
1611 establishments in England
1742 establishments in Great Britain
Extinct baronetcies in the Baronetage of England